Velichka Krumova (born 1942) is a Bulgarian chess player.

Biography
In the end of 1970s, Velichka Krumova was one of the leading Bulgarian women's chess players. She has participated in many Bulgarian Women's Chess Championship. In 1978, in Bydgoszcz Velichka Krumova shared 4th place in International Women's Chess tournament.

Velichka Krumova played for Bulgaria in the Women's Chess Olympiad:
 In 1978, at second board in the 8th Chess Olympiad (women) in Buenos Aires (+3, =7, -1).

In 2010s, Velichka Krumova continued to participate in senior chess tournaments.

References

External links
 
 
 
 

1942 births
Living people
Bulgarian female chess players
Chess Olympiad competitors
20th-century chess players